The Asian Speed Skating Championships are a series of speed skating events held annually to determine the best allround speed skater of Asia. These competitions are doubling as the qualification tournament for the World Allround Speed Skating Championships. The International Skating Union has organised the competitions since 1999.

Asian Speed Skating Championships for Men
Asian Speed Skating Championships for Women

Combined all-time medal count

Men's winners

Women's winners

References
speedskatingresults.com

 
Speed Skating
Recurring sporting events established in 1999
Recurring sporting events disestablished in 2014